Perillo is a surname. Notable people with the surname include:

 Gaetano Perillo (1897–1975), Italian politician
 Henrique Moura Perillo (born 1991), Brazilian footballer
 Jason Perillo (born 1977), American politician
 Juan Manuel Perillo (born 1985), Argentine footballer
 Justin Perillo (born 1991), American footballer
 Lucia Perillo (1958–2016), American poet
 Marconi Perillo (born 1963), Brazilian politician
 Mario Perillo (1926–2003), American businessman
 Mateo Perillo, Uruguayan rugby player
 Robert Perillo, American master voice teacher
 Steve Perillo (born 1955), businessman

See also
 Perilla, a genus of plants in the mint family
 Périllos, town in France
 Pirillo, surname

Italian-language surnames